Faisal Ali Dar is an Indian martial arts coach, and first person to receive the Padma Shri Award in sports from the union territory of Jammu and Kashmir. He was conferred with the national award for his contributions in promoting sports through martial arts and his works for keeping the youth away from drugs.

Faisal belongs to the Bandipora District.

References 

Year of birth missing (living people)
Living people
People from Bandipore district
Recipients of the Padma Shri in sports